The International Exhibition of Citriculture was a Specialised Expo recognised by the Bureau International des Expositions. The Expo took place from 21 May to 20 June 1956 in Beit Dagan, Israel and was organised within the framework of the fourth International Congress of Mediterranean Citrus Growers.

References

External links
Official website of the BIE

World's fairs in Israel
Central District (Israel)
1956 in Israel
Citrus production
1956 festivals
Agriculture in Israel
Agricultural shows